Beik may refer to:
 Myeik, Burma: Beik is the vernacular Burmese pronunciation
 Beik Baghi, a village in Ardabil Province, Iran
 Bey, a Turkish name for chieftains or leaders of small tribal groups

 Surname
 Kamal Kheir Beik (1935–1980), Syrian poet and dissident